Two steamships were named Empire Gala:

, a Hansa A Type cargo ship in service 1945-46
, a Park ship launched as Empire Gala but completed as Bir Hakeim

Ship names